On 4 July 2012, fire broke out at a gas holder, owned by Jersey Gas, on Tunnell Street, in Saint Helier, Jersey. The Jersey Fire and Rescue Service brought the fire under control, and it burnt out during the early hours of 5 July. In the aftermath of the incident Jersey Gas was fined £65,000 by the island's Royal Court and ordered to pay legal costs of £11,000.

Cause

An investigation by the Jersey Fire and Rescue Service conducted shortly after the incident determined the fire started while workers were "repairing a gas leak on the side of the holder", who were using electric tools. During this, the leaking gas ignited. The fire spread and "attacked" the joints of the holder, which caused more gas to leak out and ignite, resulting in a larger and more intense fire. Furthermore, Jersey Gas admitted to not carrying out risk assessments, not providing "a safe system of work" and providing inadequate health and safety training to its employees.

Evacuation
An area of St Helier was evacuated and cordoned off soon after the fire started. Seven nearby schools were also evacuated. Many residents who live in houses surrounding the gas holder were not allowed to return to their homes until the following day, and some sought assistance at the parish hall.

Injuries

Both employees of Jersey Gas performing the repairs suffered minor burns due to the incident.

See also
2022 St Helier explosion

References

Jersey gas holder
2012 in Jersey
Saint Helier
Disasters in the Channel Islands